Centerville Municipal Airport  is a city-owned public-use airport located three miles (5 km) north of the central business district of Centerville, a city in Hickman County, Tennessee, United States.

Facilities and aircraft 

For the 12-month period ending December 31, 2004, the airport had 6,350 aircraft operations, an average of 17 per day: 99% general aviation and 1% military. There are 14 aircraft based at this airport: 64% single-engine and 36% multi-engine.

References

External links 
CENTERVILLE MUNICIPAL - GHM at Tennessee DOT

Airports in Tennessee
Buildings and structures in Hickman County, Tennessee
Transportation in Hickman County, Tennessee